Juan Garcia-Herreros, also known as "The Snow Owl", is a Colombian bassist who plays a custom six-string electric contrabass guitar.

History
Juan Garcia-Herreros was born in Bogotá, Colombia. His first musical studies began with flute at the age 9 after moving to New York City with his family. Once he completed middle school his family relocated once again to Dunedin, Florida where he discovered the electric bass. Due to the fact that his family was unable to afford private lessons his passion for learning fueled him to become a self-taught musician. Juan was 16 when he began to teach music theory and jazz performance at Dunedin High School in Florida. His high-school band teacher encouraged him to also study acoustic bass so that he could be a part of the symphonic band in school. He auditioned and became proficient enough to perform with the Tampa Bay Symphony at 17 years of age.

At age 30, he was selected by a jury to become part of the faculty for the Jazz Institute of the Universität für Musik und darstellende Kunst Graz. He was the first Colombian to be honored with such an academic position in Austria. He left the Jazz Institute in the fall of 2012 due to a very busy touring schedule.

At age 37, he was nominated for a Latin Grammy Award in the category of Best Latin Jazz Album, for his third CD release entitled "Normas".

Awards and honors
 2006 Best Jazz Artist award, Jazz First, a cooperation between Jazzeit magazine, Quinton Records, and Erste Bank.
 Snow Owl, Quartet selected Critic's Choice in Germany by Bayerischer Rundfunk in 2006
 November 2008 – Hans Koller Preis CD of the Year for Martin Reiter's ALMA. The CD features Juan Garcia-Herreros on "Pra Frederic".
 February 2009 Selected Projekt X-Change Ambassador to represent Colombia
 2010 Art of Contrabass Guitar, Best Traditional Latin Jazz Album in America by O's Jazz newsletter.
 2011 Austrian World Music Prize recipient with Mamadou Diabate's Percussion Mania.
 2013 Art of Contrabass Guitar selected by Bass Musician magazine as one of the most 21 influential Latin Jazz CDs of the decade.
 2014 Latin Grammy Nomination, Best Latin Jazz Album, Normas
 2016 Global Music Awards Gold Medalist, World Jazz, The Blue Road
 2016 Global Music Awards Gold Medalist, Best Album, The Blue Road
 2016 Global Music Awards Gold Medalist, Best New Release 2016, The Blue Road
 2016 Global Music Awards Bronze Medalist, Instrumental Music
 2017 Quarterfinalist, Music Video Underground committee in Los Angeles, for his animated short film directorial debut of the song "She Became a Thousand Birds". The film is an homage to Omayra Sánchez and victims of the 1985 Armero tragedy in Colombia
2019: The best bass player in the world [musicradar.com].

Filmography

Discography

References

External links
 Official website

1977 births
Bass guitarists
Colombian guitarists
Colombian jazz musicians
Dunedin High School alumni
Guitarists from New York City
Living people
Male bass guitarists
Musicians from Bogotá
Musicians from Vienna
People from Dunedin, Florida
21st-century bass guitarists
21st-century American male musicians
American male jazz musicians